Dendroctonus rufipennis, the spruce beetle, is a species of bark beetle native to British Columbia, Newfoundland and Labrador, Nova Scotia, Ontario, Quebec, Northern Manitoba, the Yukon, Colorado, Wyoming, Montana, and Maine. They are known to destroy forests of spruce trees including Engelmann, White, Sitka, and Colorado blue spruce. Adults average 4 to 7 mm in length.

Life cycle

The spruce beetle Dendroctonus rufipennis Kirby (formerly D. obesus Mannerheim (== D. engelmanni Hopk.), about 6 mm long, is one of the larger bark beetles found in spruce (Rose and Lindquist 1985). White spruce and Engelmann spruce are the principal hosts (Wygant and Lejeune 1967). The beetles are attracted strongly to blowdowns, cull logs, and freshly-cut logs. Outbreaks of the spruce beetle, a transcontinental North American species, have been devastating to white and Engelmann spruces throughout western North America, from Arizona to Alaska, while smaller outbreaks have occurred in Alberta and Saskatchewan (Ives and Wong 1988). The spruce beetle is the most serious pest of mature and overmature interior spruce in British Columbia (Cottrell 1978); small-diameter, rapidly growing trees were least susceptible to attack or death from spruce beetle and the greater susceptibility of large-diameter, slowlygrowing trees was more closely related to recent radial growth than to diameter (Hard et al. 1983). Measures that maintain radial growth rates offer the most likely defence (Hard 1985, Hard and Holsten 1985, Safranyik 1985).

The initial attack in the lower trunk is indicated by the red boring dust in the bark crevices and by pitch tubes, especially when weakened or recently dead trees are attacked. Overwintering adults construct egg tunnels for brood 1 in June, and a second set of tunnels in late July for brood 2. Some members of brood 1 emerge as adults in late July and construct additional tunnels, while others overwinter as mature larvae and emerge as adults in July, along with another segment of the population that has overwintered as early larvae. A smaller bark beetle often found in spruce is the foureyed spruce bark beetle Polygraphus rufipennis Kirby.

The insect has a 1-, 2-, or 3-year life cycle, with 2-year being the most common, in which the flight and attack period starts in June or soon after most of the snow around the trees has melted. About 6 galleries per 929 cm2, each about 12.5 cm long and parallel with the grain of the wood, are made in the inner bark, and 3 to 4 groups of eggs are laid along the sides of the galleries, about 100 eggs per gallery. .Eggs hatch in 3 to 4 weeks. Larvae vary in size from about one-quarter to fully grown by the onset of the dormant season. They resume development the following June, pupate during the summer, and transform to the adult stage in later summer or early fall. The adults generally emerge from the trees, fall or crawl to the ground, and re-enter the same tree to hibernate, often clumping together under the bark. They emerge the following spring and fly to green trees, blowdowns, cull logs, or stumps to start another generation. The beetle may have a 1-year cycle at lower elevations, on warmer sites, or during an abnormally warm year, reaching the adult stage before the onset of winter. The 3-year cycle occurs at high elevations, on cold sites, or during unseasonably cold years.

Fungi such as Leptographium abietinum may help beetles to overcome the defences of weakened trees during mass attack. Ohsawa et al. (2000) isolated fungi from Dendroctonus rufipennis and Polygraphus rufipennis and from discoloured wood around their galleries in white spruce in Canada. Leptographium abietinum was the most commonly isolated blue stain fungus for both beetle species. Inoculation of 5 species of fungi commonly isolated from both beetles on white spruce seedlings resulted in 71% of the seedlings colonized by L. abietinum being killed quickly, but with no mortality of seedlings inoculated with other fungi.

Population increase

The spruce beetle is one of many beetle species that have recently increased their breeding times due to global warming. Their spread has also been aided by loggers leaving stumps that the beetles can overwinter within. The overpopulation of beetles in some forests in Kenai, Alaska, has damaged several spruce species that are no longer able to dwell there. Outbreaks from 1975 to 2000 were seen in Montana (loss of 25 million board feet), Idaho (loss of 31 million board feet), Arizona (loss of over 100 million board feet), and British Columbia (loss of 3 billion board feet). As of 2000, the beetle was responsible for the loss of about 400 million board feet annually. Dendroctonus rufipennis is also a part of the ecosystem in Colorado.

See also

Beetle kill in Colorado
Rocky Mountain bark beetle infestation

References 

Woodboring beetles
Scolytinae
Beetles of North America
Insect pests of temperate forests